Nalan Kumarasamy is an Indian film director who works in the Tamil film industry. He started his career as a short filmmaker and won the title of the first season of Naalaya Iyakunar. He made his feature film debut with Tamil film, Soodhu Kavvum (2013).

Early life
Nalan Kumarasamy did his schooling in Campion High School (Tiruchirappalli), B. E (Mechanical Engineering) in Sri Venkateswara College of Engineering(SVCE), Chennai and M.Tech. in Sastra University, Thanjavur. During his college days he was active in cultural events and participated in IIT Sarang.

Career
Nalan Kumarasamy was into event management and real estate when he heard about Naalaya Iyakunar. There were just ten days to the deadline. So he turned it meta and made a short called Oru Padam Edukkanum about a filmmaker with a deadline. He went on to make seven more short films. Nenjukku Neethi, his entry for the final round, made him first prize winner of season 1.

In 2013, he made his debut as a director with the movie Soodhu Kavvum. The film's main concept is about how baloney has engulfed people's day-to-day life and modern society. It features Vijay Sethupathi and Sanchita Shetty in the leads. It was released on 1 May to universal acclaim from critics and became a blockbuster. Soodhu Kavvum was selected for screening in the Zurich Film Festival, being the only Tamil film of 2013 to be screened there.

In 2016 he made a romantic comedy-drama film Kadhalum Kadanthu Pogum (Love, too, shall pass). It was an official remake of the Korean film My Dear Desperado. The film released in March 2016 with positive reviews from critics and became a box office hit.

Filmography

References

External links
 
 

Tamil film directors
Living people
Film directors from Chennai
Male actors from Chennai
Tamil screenwriters
Screenwriters from Tamil Nadu
Male actors in Tamil cinema
Indian male film actors
21st-century Indian male actors
21st-century Indian film directors
1980 births